Mizraab – Live & Rare is the second live album and overall the fourth album by the Pakistani progressive rock band, Mizraab, released in January 2010. It is exclusively a digital download live album, and has not been released on a physical medium. The album included recordings from the band's live performances on MTV Pakistan.

Track listing
All music written, composed & arranged by Mizraab.

Personnel
All information is taken from the website.

Mizraab
Faraz Anwar - lead vocals, lead guitar
Irfan Ahmad - drums
Shahzad Naseem - rhythm guitar, backing vocals
Rahail Siddiqui - bass, backing vocals

Production
Produced by Faraz Anwar
Recorded & Mixed at MTV Studios in Karachi, Pakistan

References

External links
Official Website
Myspace Page

2010 live albums
Mizraab albums
Urdu-language albums